Akin may refer to:

People
Akin (given name), a list of people
Akin (surname), a list of people
Akın, a list of people with the Turkish given name or surname

Places
Akin, Illinois, a town in the United States
Akin, Aksaray, a village in Aksaray Province, Turkey 
Akin, Şereflikoçhisar, a village in Ankara Province, Turkey
Akin Island, Antarctica

Other uses
Akin (band), an Australian band

See also
Akins